Politician is a novel by Piers Anthony published in 1985.

Plot summary
Politician is a novel in which Hope Hubris enters Jovian politics.

Reception
Dave Langford reviewed Politician for White Dwarf #74, and stated that "Anthony [...] is handing out personal political solutions to contemporary matters, which is wearying since you're constantly translating back into twentieth-century terms. His heart's in the right place, but the ending is a cop-out, with the constitution being set aside owing to Hubris' immense popular support. Oh yeah?"

Reviews
Review by Michael R. Collings (1985) in Fantasy Review, April 1985

References

1985 science fiction novels
Avon (publisher) books
Bio of a Space Tyrant